The following highways are numbered 612:

Australia
Bonang Highway, officially rural route C612

Canada
 Ontario Highway 612
Saskatchewan Highway 612

Costa Rica
 National Route 612

United States
 
 
New Jersey: